Papyrus Oxyrhynchus 27 (P. Oxy. 27) is a fragment of Antidosis (83, 87) by Isocrates, written in Greek. It was discovered by Grenfell and Hunt in 1897 in Oxyrhynchus. The fragment is dated to the first or second century. It is housed in the University of Chicago (Haskell Oriental Institute). The text was published by Grenfell and Hunt in 1898.

The manuscript was written on papyrus in the form of a roll. The measurements of the fragment are 52 by 127 mm. The text is written in a small upright uncial hand. Grenfell and Hunt collated the text of the manuscript on the basis of the Benseler-Blass edition (1885).

See also 
 Oxyrhynchus Papyri
 Papyrus Oxyrhynchus 26
 Papyrus Oxyrhynchus 28

References 

027
1st-century manuscripts
2nd-century manuscripts